Napinka is an unincorporated community in southwestern Manitoba, Canada.  The village of Napinka was incorporated on May 1, 1908. On January 1, 1986 the village dissolved and Napinka became part of the Rural Municipality of Brenda (now the Municipality of Brenda – Waskada).

References 

Former villages in Manitoba
Unincorporated communities in Westman Region
Populated places disestablished in 1986